Never Mind the Quality, Feel the Width is a British television sitcom first broadcast in 1967 as a single play in the Armchair Theatre anthology series, later becoming a series of half-hour episodes, which ran until 1971. A total of 40 episodes were made; along with a mini episode that was featured in ITV's All Star Comedy Carnival in 1969.

It was originally made by ABC Weekend TV for the ITV network, with its production being continued by Thames Television from the 1968 Christmas special onwards.

Plot
The plots revolves around two tailors in business together. Manny Cohen, played by John Bluthal, is Jewish, and Patrick Kelly, played by Joe Lynch, is Irish Catholic. Above their shop works Lewtas (Bernard Spear) who is also Jewish and imports cloth. Two further prominent characters are Rabbi Levy (Christopher Benjamin in the pilot – he reappeared in a later episode as Dr Shapiro – Cyril Shaps in series 1 to 4, David Nettheim and Jonathan Burn as Rabbi Stone in series 5) from the local synagogue, and Father Ryan (Denis Carey in the pilot, Eamon Kelly in series 1 to 4) from the local Catholic church. The Romanian-born Meier Tzelniker also makes several appearances as Israel Bloom.

One episode features Manny and Patrick trading the rights to display their pictures around the shop. Patrick has two pictures of the Pope on the wall, while Manny has one of Moshe Dayan. Manny's comment is "It's the going rate. Two Popes to one Moshe."

Another episode, "The Not So Kosher Cantor", has Patrick, a talented singer, filling in at the synagogue for a sick cantor, on the occasion of a visit by the Chief Rabbi. Coached to sing phonetically in Hebrew, Patrick performs, every moment milked for comedic value. Finally, the Chief Rabbi congratulates Patrick but reveals he knows something is up. When asked how he knows, he replies that at the end of the service, "you genuflected and made the sign of the cross!"

Notable guest artistes include film actors Dennis Price as a Savile Row tailor and Rupert Davies as a Roman Catholic bishop, Fred Emney, Harold Bennett, David Kossoff (playing himself), Jack Smethurst, Dad's Army stars Frank Williams (playing another clergyman) and Bill Pertwee, comedian Dick Bentley, Roy Marsden, Victor Maddern, future Coronation Street stars Barbara Knox (credited as Barbara Mullaney) and Roy Barraclough, George A. Cooper, Rita Webb, Michael Robbins, and Ellen Pollock as Manny's mother Ruby.

Film adaptation

In 1973, Bluthal and Lynch reprised their roles in a film spin-off.

DVD release
A 4-disc set of the show, containing the Thames TV series, was released on DVD in 28 June 2010, by Network. An episode from the ABC era (Man Shall Not Live By Bread Alone) was featured in a boxset titled ABC Nights In, which was also released by Network on 22 December 2020.

Episodes
The pilot and the first two series were produced by ABC; however, the second series (of six episodes) did not air until just after Thames Television launched on 30 July 1968, which initially aired the six episodes from that series over August and September that year. Of the 40 episodes made, 11 are believed to no longer exist. These are the pilot, five of the six episodes from Series 1, and five of the six episodes from Series 2.

Pilot (1967)

Series One (1967)

Series Two (1968)

Christmas Special (1968)

Series Three (1969)

Christmas Special (1969)

Series Four (1970)

Series Five (1970–71)

Series Six (1971)

See also 
List of films based on British sitcoms
The Rag Trade

References

External links

Never Mind the Quality, Feel the Width at the British TV Online Resources

1960s British sitcoms
1970s British sitcoms
1967 British television series debuts
1971 British television series endings
English-language television shows
ITV sitcoms
Television shows produced by ABC Weekend TV
Television shows produced by Thames Television
Television shows adapted into films
Television shows shot at Teddington Studios